Connect Set or Connect Sets may refer to:

Sony Connect, the organisation behind the recording of the Connect Sets
Connect Sets (Phantom Planet EP)
Connect Sets (4th Avenue Jones EP)
Connect Sets (The Decemberists EP)
Connect Sets (Mae EP), by Mae